Nassau County School District (NCSD) is a school district headquartered in Fernandina Beach, Florida. It serves all of Nassau County.

Schools

Middle and high (6-12):
 Hilliard Middle-Senior High School

High (9-12):
 Fernandina Beach High School
 West Nassau County High School
 Yulee High School

Middle (6-8):
 Callahan Middle School
 Fernandina Beach Middle School
 Yulee Middle School

Elementary (K-5):
 Bryceville Elementary School
 Hilliard Elementary School
 Wildlight Elementary School

Elementary (3-5):
 Callahan Intermediate School
 Emma Love Hardee Elementary School
 Yulee Elementary School

Elementary (K-2):
 Callahan Elementary School
 Southside Elementary School
 Yulee Primary School

Alternative:
 Nassau County Adult High School
 Nassau Virtual School

References

External links
 

School districts in Florida
Education in Nassau County, Florida